Luiz Ronaldo Nunes Rangel (born 14 August 1956), commonly known as Luisinho Rangel, Luizinho or Luiz Rangel, is a former Brazilian soccer player who played in the NASL.

Career statistics

Club

Notes

References

Living people
Brazilian footballers
Brazilian expatriate footballers
Association football midfielders
Botafogo de Futebol e Regatas players
Santa Cruz Futebol Clube players
Los Angeles Aztecs players
Americano Futebol Clube players
Volta Redonda FC players
Fortaleza Esporte Clube players
SC Vianense players
North American Soccer League (1968–1984) players
Expatriate soccer players in the United States
Brazilian expatriate sportspeople in the United States
Expatriate footballers in Portugal
Brazilian expatriate sportspeople in Portugal
1956 births
Sportspeople from Niterói